Kehvatlal Parivar is a 2022 Indian Gujarati comedy drama film written and directed by Vipul Mehta and produced by Rashmin Majithia. It stars Siddharth Randeria, Supriya Pathak, Vandana Pathak, Sanjay Goradia, Bhavya Gandhi and Shraddha Dangar. The film was released on 6 May 2022 under the banner of Coconut Motion Pictures. The film was reviewed positively by critics.

Cast 

 Siddharth Randeria as Raju Bhai Thakar
 Supriya Pathak as Kalindi Thakar
 Vandana Pathak as Bhadra
 Sanjay Goradia as Shamu Thakar
 Bhavya Gandhi as Himesh Thakar
 Shraddha Dangar as Heta Thakar
 Neel Gagdani as Sam Thakar
 Aakash Zala as Natu
 Meghana Solanki as Falguni

Pratik Gandhi, Esha Kansara, Vyoma Nandi and Parth Oza performed cameos in "Holi Aavi Aavi" song.

Plot 
Kehvatlal Parivar is a fun-packed story of Raju Bhai Thakar (Siddharth Randeria) and his family. Raju Bhai is glued to his family values and is quite steady about following his old-fashioned/traditional ideas. He has Kehvats for every moment and situation. His son (Bhavya Gandhi) shares his modern and relevant business ideas and the daughter (Shraddha Dangar) has some interesting cooking recipes but Raju Bhai never allows them to experiment. His sister (Vandana Pathak) who is lazy, lives with Raju Bhai. She spends her time playing games and on social media. His cousin (Sanjay Goradia) adopts modern ideas and hence always challenges Rajubhai in business. Their life takes interesting turn when Raju Bhai's wife Kalindi (Supriya Pathak) returns in their house. Infused with laughter, Kehvatlal Parivar is a story of an extraordinarily crazy family who despite the difficulties and differences they always stick together.

Production 
The film is written and directed by Vipul Mehta. It is produced by Rashmin Majithia under the banner of Coconut Motion Pictures. It stars Siddharth Randeria, Supriya Pathak, Vandana Pathak, Sanjay Goradia, Bhavya Gandhi and Shraddha Dangar in lead roles.

Soundtrack 

{{tracklist
| headline =Track listing
| extra_column = Singer(s)
| total_length = 16:41
| all_music= Sachin–Jigar<ref name="1e">{{Cite news | title= 'Kehvatlal Parivars first song 'Utho Utho'gets a thumb up by the listeners, watch the video here! | url=https://timesofindia.indiatimes.com/entertainment/gujarati/movies/news/kehvatlal-parivars-first-song-utho-uthogets-a-thumb-up-by-the-listeners-watch-the-video-here/articleshow/90643296.cms?|access-date= 4 April 2022|work=The Times Of India |date= 4 April 2022}}</ref>
| all_lyrics= Bhargav Purohit

| title1 = Utho Utho
| extra1 = Aditya Gadhavi
| length1 = 3:15

| title2 = Vahurani
| extra2 = Falguni Pathak
| length2 = 3:35

| title3 = Holi Aavi Aavi
| extra3 = Divya Kumar, Bhoomi Trivedi, Madhubanti Bagchi, Tanishka Sanghvi, Hariom Gadhvi
| length3 = 4:02

| title4 = Jode Tame Rahejo Raaj (Male Version)
| extra4 = Sachet Tandon
| length4 = 3:05

| title5 = Jode Tame Rahejo Raaj (Female Version)
| extra5 = Priya Saraiya
| length5 = 2:44

}}

The songs were well received by the audience.

 Release 

The film was initially slated for release in January 2022. It was released on the 6 May 2022.

 Reception 
According to Box Office Mojo, the film earned $52,842 in international markets.

Komal Nahta reviewed the film positively for its direction and performances. Keyur Seta writing for Cinestaan rated the film 3 out of 4. He praised the performances, direction, story, music and climax but criticised the reaction of the family when a dead member reappears. Parakh Bhatt of Sanj Samachar rated it 3.5 out of 5. He praised the performances of Randeria and Gandhi, music, comedy and choreography in songs. Gujarati Bhasha portal rated it 4 out of 5 but criticised the stuttering character of Goradia calling it cliché for evoking laughter. Carla Hay of Culture Mix'' praised performance, visuals and direction while criticising "mushy" sentimental moments and characters of Shamu and Natu "close to being shrieking caricatures".

References

External links 
 

Films shot in Gujarat
2020s Gujarati-language films
Indian comedy-drama films
Films set in Ahmedabad